Yang Chao is a Chinese paralympic sport shooter. He participated at the 2016 Summer Paralympics in the shooting competition, being awarded the gold medal in the men's 10 m air pistol event, scoring 571.0. Chao also participated in the mixed 50 m pistol event, being awarded the silver medal for which he scored 538.0. He participated at the 2020 Summer Paralympics in the shooting competition, being awarded the gold medal in the men's 10 m air pistol event, scoring 237.9.

References

External links 
Paralympic Games profile

Living people
Place of birth missing (living people)
Year of birth missing (living people)
Chinese male sport shooters
Paralympic shooters of China
Paralympic gold medalists for China
Paralympic silver medalists for China
Paralympic medalists in shooting
Shooters at the 2016 Summer Paralympics
Medalists at the 2016 Summer Paralympics
Shooters at the 2020 Summer Paralympics
Medalists at the 2020 Summer Paralympics
21st-century Chinese people